Withania qaraitica is a shrubby and perennial herb up to one metre tall with bright orange-red seeds patterned with honeycomb-like markings, pale yellowish brown.  It has only been found in Dhofar, but may occur in wet woodlands over the border in south Yemen.  It is closely related to two species, Withania adunenis and W. riebeckii.  Withania qaraitica occurs commonly in the wet woodlands however can be found around settlements where they have frequently been transplanted.

References 

 

Withania
Flora of Yemen